Adolph Lessig (March 1869August 12, 1935) was the business agent of the Industrial Workers of the World.

Biography
He was born in March 1869 in Philadelphia, Pennsylvania. He participated in the Paterson Silk Strike of 1913 with Bill Haywood. He died of a heart attack on August 12, 1935 at his stationery store in Paterson, New Jersey.

References

1935 deaths
Industrial Workers of the World members
Year of birth uncertain